Thagu byin (also spelt thagu pyin) is a traditional Burmese snack or mont. The sweet delicacy is essentially a sweet pudding made with sago, coconut milk and condensed milk. In recent years, thagu byin has seen a resurgence in popularity, as a packaged gift item.

References

Burmese cuisine